Golzar (also Gulzar) is a village in Kandahar Province, Afghanistan.

See also
Kandahar Province

References

External links

Populated places in Kandahar Province